Mogra Union is a union of Tangail Sadar Upazila, Tangail District, Bangladesh. It is situated 16 km north of Tangail, The District Headquarter.

Demographics
Mr. Tanvir Hossain, Son of Neshan Ali, vill: Senergagor jan, Post chowdhury Malancho, Tangail Sadar. He is working under Ministry of Industries as Management adviser
According to Population Census 2011 performed by Bangladesh Bureau of Statistics, The total population of Mogra union is 32109. There are 5614 households in total.

Education

The literacy rate of Mogra Union is 43.6% (Male-48.5%, Female-39%).

See also
 Union Councils of Tangail District

References

Populated places in Dhaka Division
Populated places in Tangail District
Unions of Tangail Sadar Upazila